The Managing Director’s Office of Emergency Management (OEM) is responsible for ensuring the readiness of the City of Philadelphia for emergencies of any kind. OEM educates the public on how to prepare for emergencies, leads citywide planning and policy development related to emergency management and coordination, mitigates the impact of emergencies, conducts training and exercises and coordinates on-scene response and recovery operations.

References

External links
Philadelphia Office of Emergency Management

Government departments of Philadelphia
1941 establishments in Pennsylvania

Emergency management in the United States